Sallys Fancy is a settlement on the island of Saint Croix in the United States Virgin Islands.

History
Sallys Fancy was a plantation owned by governor-general Peter Lotharius Oxholm.

References

Populated places in Saint Croix, U.S. Virgin Islands